Elizabeth Kiss (born 1961) is an American philosopher and academic administrator, specialising in moral and political philosophy. Since 2018, she has been the Warden of Rhodes House, Oxford University, and CEO of the Rhodes Trust. She is responsible for administering the Rhodes Scholarship, providing pastoral support to existing Rhodes Scholars and coordinating the Rhodes Trust. She is the first woman to hold this role. Previously she served as president of Agnes Scott College.

Early life and education
Kiss's parents along with her two older siblings emigrated from Hungary to the United States in 1956 following the Hungarian Revolution. Kiss was born in New York City and gained her undergraduate degree in 1983 from Davidson College in North Carolina, where she graduated Omicron Delta Kappa. She was elected a Rhodes Scholar in 1983, studied at Balliol College and received a D.Phil. from the University of Oxford in 1990.

Speaking about her childhood in a 2018 interview for Times Higher Education she said, "Being the 'American kid' in a family of refugees and political prisoners (my father was imprisoned in Hungary by both the Nazi and communist regimes) and growing up bilingual in a multicultural neighbourhood gave me experience from an early age of straddling different worlds."

In the same interview she claims it was her two older siblings' taste in 1960s music and political activism that sparked her interest in ethics, politics, and human rights.

Kiss became involved with student activism during her time at Davidson College, setting up the college's Amnesty International chapter and becoming the first female Davidson student to win a Rhodes Scholarship.

Career
Much of Kiss's research has focused on political philosophy and moral education which she believes is essential to personal and professional development.

From 1997 to 2006, Kiss was the founding director of the Kenan Institute for Ethics at Duke University in Durham, North Carolina.

She served as the eighth President of Agnes Scott College in Decatur, Georgia from 2006 to 2018. 
In 2015, she devised the SUMMIT curriculum at the college, which aims to provide students with a core curriculum where leadership development and global learning are the focuses. As college president, she changed the institution's demographic to include one-third African-American students.

In August 2018, Kiss began her tenure as Warden of Rhodes House at the University of Oxford, home of the Rhodes Scholarship, and CEO of the Rhodes Trust. She is the first woman to hold these positions.

Select honours and awards

 Council for the Advancement and Support of Education (CASE) District III Chief Executive Leadership Award, 2018.
 Named one of the Eight Most Influential People in US Higher Education by the Chronicle of Higher Education, 2017.
 The American Council on Education Award for Institutional Transformation (for Agnes Scott College), 2017.
 Turknett Leadership Character Award for Higher Education, 2007.

References

External links

 Biography - Agnes Scott College
 Elizabeth Kiss ' 83 Named Eighth President of Agnes Scott College - Davidson College
 Duke's Elizabeth Kiss to Head to Agnes Scott - Duke University
 Elizabeth Kiss Elected Eighth President of Agnes Scott - collegenews.org

Heads of universities and colleges in the United States
American Rhodes Scholars
Alumni of Balliol College, Oxford
Davidson College alumni
Duke University faculty
Fellows of Balliol College, Oxford
Agnes Scott College
Randolph–Macon College faculty
Princeton University faculty
Deep Springs College faculty
Harvard University staff
1961 births
Living people
Political philosophers
20th-century American philosophers
American women philosophers
American women political scientists
American political scientists
Women heads of universities and colleges
20th-century American women
21st-century American women